The Fettered Woman is a 1917 American silent drama film directed by Tom Terriss and starring Alice Joyce, Webster Campbell, and Donald MacBride. Based on the 1914 novel Anne's Bridge by Robert W. Chambers, it is now considered a lost film.

Cast
 Alice Joyce as Angelina Allende 
 Webster Campbell as James Deane 
 Donald MacBride as Jack Wolver 
 Lionel Grey as Tobe 
 Templar Saxe as Adolph Bink

References

Bibliography
 Donald W. McCaffrey & Christopher P. Jacobs. Guide to the Silent Years of American Cinema. Greenwood Publishing, 1999.

External links
 

1917 films
1917 drama films
1910s English-language films
American silent feature films
Silent American drama films
American black-and-white films
Films directed by Tom Terriss
Vitagraph Studios films
Films based on works by Robert W. Chambers
Lost American films
1910s American films